The Roman Catholic Diocese of Chiang Rai (Dioecesis Chiangraiensis) is in northern Thailand. It is a suffragan diocese of the Archdiocese of Bangkok.

The diocese covers an area of 37,839 km2, covering four provinces: Chiang Rai, Nan, Phayao, Phrae and Ngao District of the Lampang Province. The diocese is divided into 16 parishes, having 47 priests altogether.

, of the 2.684 million citizens in the area, 18,062 are members of the Catholic Church.

History
The diocese was erected on 25 April 2018, when it was split off from the Diocese of Chiang Mai.

Cathedral
The Nativity of Our Lady Cathedral in Chiang Rai.

Bishops
Joseph Vuthilert Haelom: appointed 25 April 2018

References

External links
Profile at Catholic Hierarchy 

Chiang Mai
Chiang Mai
2018 establishments in Thailand